Jerzy Jarnuszkiewicz (1919–2005) was a Polish sculptor. His work was part of the painting event in the art competition at the 1948 Summer Olympics.

References

External links
Information on works (in Polish)
Image Gallery

1919 births
1987 deaths
20th-century Polish sculptors
Polish male sculptors
20th-century male artists
Olympic competitors in art competitions